Tihomir Novak (born 24 October 1986) is a Croatian futsal player who plays for KMN Dobovec, Slovenia and the Croatia national futsal team.

References

External links 
 UEFA profile
 

1986 births
Living people
Futsal forwards
Croatian men's futsal players
Croatian expatriate sportspeople in Italy